Three (also referred to as epThree) is the third EP release by British alternative rock band Hundred Reasons. It was released in 2001 and reached #37 in the UK album chart.

Track listing
I'll Find You 03:02
Sunny 04:00
Slow Motion 03:02
I'll Find You (CD Extra Video)

2001 EPs
Hundred Reasons albums